Greville Maynard Wynne (19 March 1919 – 28 February 1990) was a British engineer and businessman recruited by MI6 because of his frequent travel to Eastern Europe. He acted as a courier to transport top-secret information to London from Soviet agent Oleg Penkovsky. 

Wynne and Penkovsky were both arrested by the KGB in November 1962, when some of the information their endeavours produced was of assistance to the West during the Cuban Missile Crisis. They were convicted of espionage. Penkovsky was executed the following year and Wynne was sentenced to eight years imprisonment. He was detained at Lubyanka prison. Struggling with deteriorating health, he was released in 1964 in exchange for the Soviet spy Konon Molody.

Early life
Wynne was born in Shropshire, England, and raised in Ystrad Mynach, South Wales. His father was a foreman in an engineering workshop. He struggled with dyslexia and left school at 14 to work for an electrical contractor. He then worked at a telephone factory as an apprentice.

After the Second World War, he traded in electrical equipment,  travelling often through Europe and India. Wynne married Sheila Beaton in 1946; the couple had a son, Andrew, born in 1952. His business extended into Eastern Bloc countries from 1955.

MI6 and later life 
In November 1960, Wynne was recruited by MI6 and asked to make a sales trip to Moscow, where he made contact with Oleg Penkovsky, a high-ranking GRU officer. Penkovsky had made earlier offers to spy for the West. Wynne later became an intermediary and courier for Penkovsky, smuggling top-secret Soviet intelligence to London on return from his frequent trips to the USSR.

Wynne's and Penkovsky's espionage activities were discovered by the KGB. Both men were arrested in November 1962, around the time of the Cuban Missile Crisis. Wynne and Penkovsky each pleaded guilty on 7 May 1963 and were sentenced four days later.  Wynne was sentenced to eight years in prison.  Penkovsky was sentenced to death and executed by firing squad, though Wynne believed he died by suicide in prison.

Wynne was held at the Lubyanka. In April 1964, amid British concerns for his deteriorating health, Wynne was released in exchange for the Soviet spy Konon Molody (also known as Gordon Lonsdale).

After his release, Wynne returned to his business career. He and his wife Sheila divorced, and Wynne became estranged from his son and only child, Andrew. In 1970 Wynne married Johanna Herma Van Buren. The couple separated a few years before his death but were still legally married when he died.

On 23 May 1966, he appeared as himself in an episode of the American television series To Tell the Truth, receiving two of four possible votes. 

Wynne struggled with depression and alcoholism in the aftermath of imprisonment. He died of throat cancer at the Cromwell Hospital in London on 28 February 1990, aged 70.

Questions over pre-Penkovsky MI5 work
Later in life, Wynne wrote two books about his work for British intelligence: The Man from Moscow (1967) and The Man from Odessa (1981). In these books, Wynne claimed to have been recruited by MI5 as early as the Second World War, long before his work with Penkovsky. Historians question this account. The authors of The Spy Who Saved the World wrote, “He [Wynne] had no previous intelligence experience or training.” Others have made similar assessments, stating that Wynne was a civilian at the time of his recruitment by MI6 in 1960.

Portrayal in popular culture
Wynne was portrayed by David Calder in the 1985 BBC television serial Wynne and Penkovsky.
He was portrayed by Peter Lindford in the 2007 BBC Television docudrama Nuclear Secrets.
He was portrayed by Benedict Cumberbatch in the 2021 film The Courier. His wife Sheila was portrayed by Jessie Buckley.

References

Further reading

 
 Also published as: Contact on Gorky Street and Wynne and Penkovsky.

External links

Greville Wynne Picture
BBC: Account of Wynne's trial

1919 births
1990 deaths
Alumni of the University of Nottingham
British expatriates in the Soviet Union
British spies against the Soviet Union
Deaths from cancer in England
Deaths from esophageal cancer
MI5 personnel
People extradited from the Soviet Union
Prisoners and detainees of the Soviet Union
Secret Intelligence Service personnel